Nathan Lopez (born Louie Nathanael Buado Lopez, August 19, 1991) is a Filipino actor, who has worked in both film and television productions in the Philippines. He gained international exposure and acclaim as the title character in Ang Pagdadalaga ni Maximo Oliveros.

Career
At the age of 13, he went with a friend who was auditioning to play Maxi, the central character in Ang Pagdadalaga ni Maximo Oliveros, but was selected by the producer for the part: an openly gay 12-year-old boy who comes from a petty criminal family and falls in love with a handsome policeman. He won 2 awards for the movie, which was also the Philippine nomination as Best Foreign Language Film in the 79th Academy Awards.

In 2007 he was cast in the TV series Sana Maulit Muli, playing Romeo, a gay friend of the central character Jasmine. In the morning TV series entitled Be Careful with My Heart, he played Emman, the gay friend of Maya (played by Jodi Sta. Maria).

He later transferred to GMA Network and took a supporting role in the series The Stepdaughters.

Filmography

Television

Movies

Awards
 2006 Las Palmas Film Festival: Best Actor for Ang Pagdadalaga ni Maximo Oliveros
 2005 Cinemalaya Independent Film Festival: Special Citation for Ang Pagdadalaga ni Maximo Oliveros

Personal life

Lopez's mother is a pastor and his father owns a printing business. He has four elder sisters and a twin brother Gamaliel (Gammy) with whom he co-starred in the 2008 film Krisis.

Although he has frequently been cast to play gay characters, Lopez is not gay, and credited his sisters for helping him with his first gay role as Maxi.

References

External links

1991 births
21st-century Filipino male actors
Filipino male child actors
Filipino male television actors
Living people
Male actors from Manila
Filipino twins
Filipino male film actors

Star Magic
ABS-CBN personalities
GMA Network personalities